The Huron River is a river in southeast Michigan that empties into Lake Erie.

Huron River may also refer to:

Rivers
 Huron River (rivière du Chêne tributary), Chaudière-Appalaches, Quebec, Canada

United States
 Huron River (northern Michigan) or Big Huron River in the northern Upper Peninsula of Michigan that empties into Lake Superior
 Little Huron River in the northern Upper Peninsula of Michigan that empties into Lake Superior
 Huron River (Ohio) in north central Ohio that empties into Lake Erie

Other uses
 Huron River platform (2011), the seventh-generation Centrino platform CPUs from Intel
 Huron River Area Credit Union, Michigan, USA

See also

 Clinton River (Michigan), known as the Huron River until 1824
 Huron river chain of lakes, Michigan, USA
 Rivière des Hurons (disambiguation)
 Huron (disambiguation)